The South Shore Charter Public School (SSCPS) is a public charter school located in Norwell, Massachusetts, United States. SSCPS serves students from grades K12. The K12 system is divided as follows: Level I (K2), Level II (34), Level III (56), Level IV (78), and High School (912). The school's student population, as of the 2022–2023 academic school year is 1,009 students in grades Kindergarten-12.

To become a student of the school, one must apply and be selected in a lottery process. Spots that have the most attention are generally in the lower grades whereas high school (especially 11th and 12th grade) generally has the shortest waiting list for new students.

History 
The school (founded in 1995) formerly operated under the name of "South Shore Charter School" and was divided into three different grade based locations along the shore of Nantasket Beach in Hull, Massachusetts prior to moving to its new location, Norwell, Massachusetts, in 2004, whereupon all three entities unified into one school.

In 2010, the school was nominated by Scholastics as America's Greenest School and was rewarded with a hybrid school bus. In addition, the school also won $20,000 for a “green audit/makeover for the school,” a $3,000 scholarship to be divided among the grades, and $500 for classroom supplies.

Curriculum 
The Massachusetts Curriculum Frameworks serve as the foundation for the K–12 curriculum, with some fusion with the Core Knowledge Curriculum pioneered by pedagogue E.D Hirsch.  It blends traditional academics intended to get students ready for college expectations with hands-on learning via Projects & Workshops. 

At South Shore Charter Public School, projects and workshops play a crucial role in the school's educational philosophies and mission. These projects and workshops are structured as experiential learning structures that allow students to apply knowledge and skills (outlined in the Massachusetts Curriculum Frameworks) to specific tasks that fulfill community needs.

Community Service 
One of South Shore Charter Public School's driving principles is service. All students K-12 are required to fulfill community service hours outside of school.

Names
South Shore Charter School (SSCS, Hull) (1995–2004)
South Shore Charter Public School (SSCPS, Norwell) (2004–present)

Notable faculty
Jody Regan, New England artist

Notable alumni
Johnny Earle, founder of Johnny Cupcakes.

References

External links
Official website

Schools in Plymouth County, Massachusetts
Charter schools in Massachusetts
Public high schools in Massachusetts
Public middle schools in Massachusetts
Public elementary schools in Massachusetts